This is a list of the extreme points of Kyrgyzstan.

Cardinal directions
Northernmost point: Sokuluk District, Chüy Region

Southernmost point: Chong-Alay District, Osh Region

Easternmost point: Ak-Suu District, Issyk-Kul Region

Westernmost point: Leilek District, Batken Region

Elevation

See also 

Geography of Kyrgyzstan
Extreme points of Asia

References 

Geography of Kyrgyzstan
Kyrgyzstan